Marcel Ibsen Rømer (born 8 August 1991) is a Danish professional footballer who plays as a midfielder for Danish Superliga club Lyngby Boldklub.

Career

HB Køge
Rømer started his youth career with Køge Boldklub before moving to the youth academy of Herfølge Boldklub at age 9. On 1 November 2009, Rømer made his professional debut for the merger club, HB Køge, as a late substitute for Lasse Kronborg in a 0–0 draw against SønderjyskE. He played four full seasons for the club, in which he made 105 total appearances, scoring four goals.

Viborg
In September 2013, on the last day of the transfer window, Rømer signed a three-year contract with Viborg FF. He made his debut on 15 September in a 1–0 away win over AGF.

In his three seasons with Viborg, Rømer made a total of 63 appearances, in which he scored five goals.

SønderjyskE
On 17 December 2015, it was announced that Rømer had signed for SønderjyskE in search of more playing time, as he had been mostly benched during the first six months of the season. The contract with SønderjyskE was valid until the summer of 2018. He made his debut for SønderjyskE in the Danish Superliga on 6 March 2016, when he came on as a substitute for Janus Drachmann in the 90th minute of a 3–1 win at home over Brøndby. On 30 April, he scored his first goal for the club in a 2–1 away victory over Hobro after an assist by Johan Absalonsen.

In the following season, Rømer made his European debut. On 14 July 2016, he was a starter in the 2–1 home win over Strømsgodset in the first round of the UEFA Europa League.

Rømer would make 117 total appearances during his spell at SønderjyskE, scoring 6 goals.

Lyngby
On 31 August 2019, Rømer joined Lyngby Boldklub on a four-year deal from SønderjyskE. He suffered relegation to the Danish 1st Division with the club on 9 May 2021 after a loss to last placed AC Horsens.

Personal life
His brother, André Rømer is also a professional footballer.

In recent years, Rømer has become more religious and wears a cross necklace. When he takes off the necklace before practice or a match, he kisses the cross and prays.

Career statistics

Honours
Viborg
1st Division: 2014–15

References

External links

1991 births
Living people
Danish men's footballers
Danish Superliga players
Danish 1st Division players
Association football midfielders
Køge Boldklub players
HB Køge players
Viborg FF players
SønderjyskE Fodbold players
Lyngby Boldklub players
People from Køge Municipality
Sportspeople from Region Zealand